Thomas Geve (born October 27, 1929) is an engineer, author and Jewish Holocaust survivor

Born in Stettin in 1929, he lived as child in Beuthen, before moving to Berlin with his mother in 1939. During the war years, he worked for some months as a gravedigger at the Weißensee Cemetery. He was deported to Auschwitz in June 1943 with his mother, who perished in the camp. He stayed in Auschwitz till its evacuation in January 1945, after which he still survived the death march, Gross-Rosen concentration camp and Buchenwald concentration camp before the latter was self-liberated by the inmates in April 1945. Upon liberation he was too weak to leave the camp and proceeded  to record camp life in 79 different drawings. After the war, he went to a camp in Switzerland for orphaned shoah survivors, and when his father was located, he was reunited with him in England. In 1950 he emigrated to Israel and settled in Haifa.

His experiences are retold in two books and two documentary films. The first book, Youth in Chains, recounting his wartime years, was subsequently republished and translated into six other languages. His second book, recounting his experiences after the war, was published in German. In addition, his drawings have also been published separately and made into a French-language documentary. Today, he lectures about the Shoah at schools in Germany and other countries.

References and footnotes

Bibliography
 , 151 pp.
 , 193 pp.
 , 304 pp.

Documentary film
 W Rosing, "Thomas Geve - Nichts als das Leben", 1997, 36 min.
 ECPAD, "Il n'y a pas d'enfants ici : Dessins d'un enfant survivant des camps de concentration", 2009, 75 min.

External links
www.thomasgeve.com

1929 births
Auschwitz concentration camp survivors
Buchenwald concentration camp survivors
German emigrants to Israel
Gross-Rosen concentration camp survivors
Living people
Pseudonymous writers
Writers from Berlin